Douglas Chiarotti (born November 10, 1970), known as Douglas, is a Brazilian former volleyball player who competed in the 1992 Summer Olympics and in the 2000 Summer Olympics.

He was born in Santo André, São Paulo, Brazil.

In 1992 he was part of the Brazilian team which won the gold medal in the Olympic tournament. He played six matches.

Eight years later he finished sixth with the Brazilian team in the 2000 Olympic tournament. He played all eight matches.

References
 
 

1970 births
Living people
Brazilian men's volleyball players
Olympic volleyball players of Brazil
Volleyball players at the 1992 Summer Olympics
Volleyball players at the 2000 Summer Olympics
Olympic gold medalists for Brazil
Olympic medalists in volleyball
Medalists at the 1992 Summer Olympics
Pan American Games medalists in volleyball
Pan American Games silver medalists for Brazil
Volleyball players at the 1999 Pan American Games
Medalists at the 1999 Pan American Games
Sportspeople from São Paulo